Vaughan Williams (born 19 December 1977) is an Australian cricketer. He played one first-class match for New South Wales in 2001/02.

See also
 List of New South Wales representative cricketers

References

External links
 

1977 births
Living people
Australian cricketers
New South Wales cricketers